The Philip Merrill Award for Outstanding Contributions to Liberal Arts Education is an annual prize given by the American Council of Trustees and Alumni to an individual who has “made an extraordinary contribution to the advancement of liberal arts education, core curricula, and the teaching of Western civilization and American history.” The award is named for the late public servant, publisher, entrepreneur, and philanthropist Philip Merrill.

Merrill was a trustee of Cornell University, the University of Maryland Foundation, the Johns Hopkins School of Advanced International Studies, the Smithsonian National Museum of American History, and the Aspen Institute, as well as a member of the National Council of the American Council of Trustees and Alumni.

Winners
 2005: Robert P. George, McCormick Professor of Jurisprudence, Princeton University
 2006: Harvey C. Mansfield, William R. Kenan, Jr. Professor of Government, Harvard University
 2007: Gertrude Himmelfarb, Professor Emerita, City University of New York
 2008: Donald Kagan, Sterling Professor of History and Classics, Yale University
 2009: KC Johnson, Professor of History, Brooklyn College
 2010: Benno Schmidt, Chairman of the Board of Trustees, City University of New York
 2011: David McCullough, independent scholar
 2012: Tom Rollins, founder of the Teaching Company
 2013: Gary Gallagher, Professor of History, University of Virginia
 2014: Louise Mirrer, president and CEO of the New-York Historical Society
 2015: Hank Brown, former Republican politician and U.S. Senator from Colorado who served as president of the University of Colorado system from April 2005 to January 2008.
 2016: Niall Ferguson and Ayaan Hirsi Ali
 2017: Robert Zimmer, President, University of Chicago
 2018: Mitch Daniels, President, Purdue University
2019: José A. Cabranes, United States circuit judge of the United States Court of Appeals for the Second Circuit

References

External links

American awards
Liberal arts education